William Walter "Bill" Warner (February 11, 1969 – July 14, 2013) was an American motorcycle racer who set a land speed record on a conventional motorcycle in 2011. He was killed in a motorcycle racing crash in 2013.

Warner was born in Little Falls, New York. He studied marine biology and chemistry at the University of Tampa. Warner was a tropical fish farmer in Wimauma, Florida.

Bill Warner began land speed racing his unfaired normally-aspirated  Yamaha V-max in March 2007, with a run in Maxton, North Carolina which placed him in the East Coast Timing Association (ECTA) Maxton 200 MPH Club.  He purchased an unfaired turbo Suzuki Hayabusa in 2008, and quickly set the fastest unfaired motorcycle records in land speed racing, eventually reaching  in 2010 at the Texas Mile. That same year, Warner built, with the consultation of Bonneville motorcycle racer Larry Forstall, a set of Modified-class fiberglass fairings for his Hayabusa. With this bodywork, plus sponsorship and managerial support from Walt Kudron, he set the Maxton track record on the standing mile at the ECTA meet in May 2010, going . In addition to the Maxton track record, Warner also holds track records at the Texas Mile at Goliad, Loring (311 mph) and California's Mojave Air and Space Port land speed sanctions.

After going 278 mph in a mile on a Modified-class land speed motorcycle, Warner began building a new, Altered-class chassis, engine, and bodywork in order to attempt to break the  barrier on a conventional (rider-exposed) motorcycle. This undertaking was supported by many industry and personal sponsors, and absorbed all of Warner's time and energy. After breaking 300 on his first attempt in 2011, running  on a 1.5 mile track, Warner sought to break 300 mph in a single mile, after which he planned to retire from ultimate land speed racing, auction his racing motorcycle, and manage his own standing-mile land speed event in Houston, Texas.

His motorcycle veered off the course and struck a 6" concrete landing light pedestal and he was thrown a great distance. Warner was conscious after the crash, but was pronounced dead at Cary Medical Center in Caribou, Maine. He had achieved  in a mile at the event, in less than optimal conditions. The cause of the accident is unclear, though investigators suspect mechanical or tire failure. He was survived by his parents, brother, and sister.

References 

1969 births
2013 deaths
Motorcycle land speed record people
Motorcycle racers who died while racing
People from Little Falls, New York
People from Hillsborough County, Florida
Sports deaths in Maine
Sportspeople from Florida
Sportspeople from New York (state)
University of Tampa alumni